The 110th Wing (110th WG) is a unit of the Michigan Air National Guard, stationed at Battle Creek Air National Guard Base, Battle Creek, Michigan. If activated to federal service the Wing would be gained by the United States Air Force Air Combat Command.

Overview
The main operations unit of the wing is the 110th Operations Group, a remote-split operations center for MQ-1 Predator and MQ-9 Reaper operations for Third Air Force. The aircraft and a contingent of maintainers are deployed forward, along with some pilots to handle takeoffs and landings, but the majority of the pilots remain stateside and operate the aircraft via satellite communications links.

Units
 110th Operations Group
 172d Air Support Squadron
 110th Operations Support Squadron 
 272d Cyber Operations Squadron 
 110th Mission Support Group 
 110th Medical Group
 217th Air Operations Group

History
In 1956 the 172d Fighter-Interceptor Squadron (FIS) of the Michigan Air National Guard was authorized to expand to a group level, and the United States Air Force constituted the 110th Fighter Group (Air Defense) and associated support units and allotted them to the Air National Guard for activation. The 172d FIS became the group's flying squadron. Other squadrons assigned into the group were the 110th Material Squadron, 110th Air Base Squadron, and the 110th USAF Dispensary.

In 1957, the 172d FIS received a new aircraft, the RB-57 Canberra, and a new mission – tactical reconnaissance. The resulting reorganization cost the 110th Fighter Group 40 percent of its manpower and its name – the group was inactivated and the 172d, now the 172d Tactical Reconnaissance Squadron, once again became Battle Creek's primary Air National Guard unit. The activation of a non-flying squadron, the 127th Reconnaissance Technical Squadron, helped prevent the loss of additional Guard members.

In 1962, the 110th Tactical Reconnaissance Group and support organizations were reactivated with Major Howard Strand serving as its commander. Major Strand departed in January 1965 to become deputy commander of the 127th Tactical Reconnaissance Wing at Selfridge AFB, Michigan.  He returned again in 1974 to lead the 110th until 1981.

The 172d flew Canberras until 1971, when it undertook the radical and unexpected transformation from the RB-57 jets to the smaller, prop-powered Cessna O-2 Skymaster. On 11 June 1971, the 110th Tactical Reconnaissance Group became the 110th Tactical Air Support Group. In 1980, the 110th saw a return to jet power when it reequipped with OA-37 Dragonfly.

In 1991 the 110th Tactical Air Support Group transitioned from the Dragonfly to the OA-10 Thunderbolt II, and was redesignated the 110th Fighter Group.  In June 1995 the 110th Fighter Group became the 110th Fighter Wing.

In 1997 the wing took part in Operation Deny Flight. The 110th Fighter Wing served in both Iraq and Afghanistan, supporting Operation Iraqi Freedom and Operation Enduring Freedom.

In May 1999 the 110th Fighter Wing was deployed to Trapani Italy in support of Operation Noble Anvil, the air operations over Kosovo.

The 110th Fighter Wing underwent a major transition moving from the A-10 aircraft to the Learjet C-21A aircraft in 2008. The C-21, which arrived in October 2008, is a twin turbofan engine passenger aircraft, the military version of the Lear Jet 35A. For aero medical evacuations, it can carry one little litter or five ambulatory patients plus one flight nurse and two medical technicians. The 110th Fighter Wing was redesignated as the 110th Airlift Wing with no change in station. It changed from an Air Combat Command unit to an Air Mobility Command unit on 1 December 2009.

The base also witnessed the creation of a new unit, the 217th Air Operations Group (AOG) on 1 April 2009. The 217th AOG is an organization supporting the 17th Air Force (AFAFRICA). The 217th AOG has four squadrons that include intelligence, communications, operations and Air Force Forces planning in a largely self-contained package.

On 13 December 2014, in a ceremony presided by Gov. Rick Snyder, the wing was redesignated as the 110th Attack Wing.

On 1 March 2019, the wing was officially renamed from the 110th Attack Wing to 110th Wing by the National Guard Bureau, Washington, D.C.

Lineage
 Constituted as the 110th Fighter Group (Air Defense)and allotted to the Air National Guard on 15 April 1956
 Extended federal recognition and activated on 1 September 1956
 Inactivated c. 12 April 1958
 Redesignated 110th Tactical Reconnaissance Group
 Activated on 1 October 1962
 Redesignated 110th Tactical Air Support Group on 11 June 1971
 Redesignated 110th Fighter Group on 16 October 1991
 Redesignated 110th Fighter Wing on 1 October 1995
 Redesignated 110th Airlift Wing, 1 March 2009
 Redesignated 110th Attack Wing, 13 December 2014
 Redesignated 110th Wing

Assignments
 127th Air Defense Wing, 1 September 1956 – 12 April 1958
 127th Tactical Reconnaissance Wing, 1 October 1962
 Michigan Air National Guard, 11 June 1971
 128th Tactical Fighter Wing (later 128th Fighter Wing), 16 October 1991
 Michigan Air National Guard, 1 October 1995

 Gaining Commands
 Air Defense Command, 1 September 1956 – 12 April 1958
 Tactical Air Command, 1 October 1962
 Air Combat Command, 1 June 1992
 Air Mobility Command, 1 March 2009
 Air Combat Command, 1 October 2013

Components
Groups
 110th Operations Group, 1 June 1992 – present
 110th Logistics Group (later 110th Maintenance Group), 1 October 1995 – 30 September 2013
 110th Medical Group, 15 October 1962 – Present
 110th Support Group (later 110th Mission Support Group), 1 October 1995 – present
 217th Air Operations Group, 1 April 2009 – present

Operational Squadron
 172d Airlift Squadron, 1 September 1956 – 30 June 1957; 1 October 1962 – 1 June 1992

Stations
 W. K. Kellogg Airport, Michigan, 1 September 1956 – 30 June 1957; 1 October 1962–
 Designated: Battle Creek Air National Guard Base, Michigan, 1991–Present

Aircraft

MQ-9 Reaper (2013–Present)
C-21A Learjet (2009–2013)
A-10A Thunderbolt II (1991–2009)
OA-10A Thunderbolt II (1991–2009)
OA-37B Dragonfly (1981–1991)

O-2A Skymaster (1971–1981)
RB-57 Canberra (1962–1971)
F-89C Scorpion (1956–1957)

References

Notes

Bibliography

 110th Airlift Wing history webpage
 110th Airlift Wing@globalsecurity.org
 Rogers, B. (2006). United States Air Force Unit Designations Since 1978. 

Wings of the United States Air National Guard
Military units and formations in Michigan
Attack units and formations of the United States Air Force
Military units and formations established in 2014